Taking Back Sunday is an American rock band from Long Island, New York, formed in 1999 and featuring the current line-up of Adam Lazzara (lead vocals), John Nolan (guitar, keyboards, vocals), Shaun Cooper (bass guitar), and Mark O'Connell (drums, percussion), accompanied on tour by Nathan Cogan (guitars, keyboards). The group was originally formed by Antonio Longo, John Nolan, Eddie Reyes, Jesse Lacey, and Steven DeJoseph. The band has gone through multiple line-up changes in their career spanning seven studio albums. There have been eleven official members of Taking Back Sunday, four touring members, and twenty-three session members.

The band's first line-up change was in 2001, with the departure of bassist Jesse Lacey and drummer Steven DeJoseph, who were replaced by current members Adam Lazzara and Mark O'Connell. Not long after, original lead vocalist Antonio Longo also departed from the band, leaving Lazzara on lead vocals duty. Being left without a bassist, Eddie Reyes brought in Shaun Cooper to play bass guitar for the band. Soon after the band headed to the studio to record and release their debut studio album, Tell All Your Friends.

The band's second line-up change came when founding member and guitarist, keyboardist, and vocalist John Nolan and bassist Shaun Cooper announced their departure from the band in 2003. Nolan and Cooper were replaced by Fred Mascherino and Matt Rubano, with Mascherino performing guitars and vocals, along with Rubano performing bass guitar. With a fresh line-up, the band went onto release two more studio albums, Where You Want to Be and major label debut, Louder Now.

The band's third line-up change came in 2007, when Fred Mascherino left the band to pursue his solo project, The Color Fred and later his current band, Terrible Things. He was replaced by Matthew Fazzi, who was announced to be an official member on 2008, providing guitars, keyboards, and vocals. Mascherino went on to reveal in later interviews stating, "There were just problems between the five of us about writing, who was going to do it and how we were going to do it, we weren't being very productive because we were fighting too much about that stuff. The band was more about cooking food than making music." With continued extensive touring with the new line-up, the band went on to release their only studio album with Fazzi, New Again.

The next line-up change came in 2010 when Matt Rubano and Matthew Fazzi announced that they were no longer members of Taking Back Sunday. Later it was announced that John Nolan and Shaun Cooper had re-joined the band. With the reunion of the Tell All Your Friends line-up in seven years, the band went onto release Taking Back Sunday, Happiness Is, and their latest effort, Tidal Wave.

The band's most recent line-up change came in 2018 when the band announced that they have parted ways with founding member and guitarist, Eddie Reyes for "personal reasons". This was later confirmed by Reyes stating the reason for his departure was due to his battle with alcoholism. This leaves only two constant members throughout the band's timeline after their formation, drummer Mark O'Connell and lead singer, Adam Lazzara, as well as one founding member, guitarist John Nolan.

Official members

Current

Former

Other contributors

Touring

Session

Timeline

References

Taking Back Sunday